
Gmina Wronki is an urban-rural gmina (administrative district) in Szamotuły County, Greater Poland Voivodeship, in west-central Poland.

Villages
Apart from the town of Wronki, Gmina Wronki contains the villages and settlements of Aleksandrowo, Biezdrowo, Borek, Chojno, Chojno-Błota Małe, Chojno-Błota Wielkie, Chojno-Leśniczówka, Chojno-Młyn, Ćmachowo, Dąbrowa, Dębogóra, Głuchowiec, Głuchowo, Gogolice, Huby-Oporowo, Jasionna, Józefowo, Karolewo, Kłodzisko, Krasnobrzeg, Lubowo, Lubowo Drugie, Łucjanowo, Lutyniec, Marianowo, Maszewice, Mokrz, Nadolnik, Nowa Wieś, Nowy Kraków, Obelżanki, Olesin, Olin, Oporowo-Huby, Pakawie, Pierwoszewo, Piła, Popowo, Pożarowo, Pustelnia, Rzecin, Samita, Samołęż, Smolnica, Stare Miasto, Stróżki, Szklarnia, Szostaki, Tomaszewo, Warszawa, Wartosław, Wierzchocin, Winnogóra, Wróblewo and Zdroje.

Neighbouring gminas
Gmina Wronki is bordered by the gminas of Chrzypsko Wielkie, Drawsko, Lubasz, Obrzycko, Ostroróg, Pniewy, Sieraków and Wieleń.

References
Polish official population figures 2006

Wronki
Szamotuły County